Søren Stærmose (born 20 April 1952 in Odense) is a Danish film producer.

Filmography
 Christian, (1989)
 Grandpa's Journey, (1993)
 The Fire Engine That Disappeared, (executive, 1993)
 Murder at the Savoy, (1993)
 The Man on the Balcony, (executive, 1993)
 The Police Murderer, (executive, 1994)
 Stockholm Marathon, (1994)
 Lumière and Company, (1995)
 The Disappearance of Finbar, (1996)
 A Corner of Paradise, (1997)
 Zingo, (1998)
 Capricciosa, (2003)
 Wallander, (2005-2006)
 Irene Huss, (2007-2008)
 The Girl with the Dragon Tattoo, (2009)
 The Girl Who Played with Fire, (2009)
 The Girl Who Kicked the Hornets' Nest, (2009)
 Millennium, (2010)
 The Girl with the Dragon Tattoo, (2011)
 A Place in the Sun, (2012)
 Echoes from the Dead, (2013)
 Det som göms i snö, (2018)
 The Girl in the Spider's Web, (2018)
 Thin Ice, (2020)

References

1952 births
Living people
Danish film producers
Filmmakers who won the Best Foreign Language Film BAFTA Award